Joel Basaldúa (born 22 June 1974) is a Peruvian wrestler. He competed in the men's Greco-Roman 52 kg at the 1996 Summer Olympics.

References

1974 births
Living people
Peruvian male sport wrestlers
Olympic wrestlers of Peru
Wrestlers at the 1996 Summer Olympics
Place of birth missing (living people)
20th-century Peruvian people